The October 1187 papal election (held October 21) was convoked after the death of Pope Urban III. He and the papal court had escaped from the imperial blockade of Verona only the month before, and had taken refuge in Ferrara. The election, held in Ferrara the day after the pope's death, resulted in the election of Cardinal Alberto Sartori di Morra, who took the name of Gregory VIII. He was a partisan of the Emperor Frederick Barbarossa, whose election delighted him. Gregory VIII reigned only two months.

Popes at Verona
Lucius III was elected on 1 September 1181, but had to be consecrated and enthroned at Velletri, due to the hostility of the Romans. He was only allowed back to Rome at the end of October, but in mid-March 1182, having refused to grant the consuetudines conceded by earlier popes, he was forced to retreat to Velletri. In the meantime, refugees from Tusculum, which had been destroyed earlier in the century by the Roman commune, began to rebuild their fortifications. Annoyed by the challenge, the Roman commune reopened the war. Pope Lucius took the part of the Tusculans, but as the Romans had one success after another, he called for aid from the imperial Vicar in Italy, Archbishop Christian of Mainz, who managed to drive the Romans back. The Romans renewed their offensive, devastated the territory of Tusculum in April 1184, and then turned their wrath against Latium. The pope then fled to the Emperor Frederick, who was at Verona. The pope wanted aid against the Romans, of course, but there was also the issue of the inheritance of Countess Mathilda of Tuscany, which had been willed to Saint Peter, but which was occupied by the emperor, on the grounds that it was part of the empire and Mathilda and her husbands had been his vassals. Frederick wanted the pope to preside at an imperial coronation for his son Henry. When the pope adamantly refused, Henry invaded and ravaged the Roman campagna; Frederick besieged the pope in Verona, forbidding appeals to the pope from anyone in his domains, and obstructing appeals from elsewhere. Anyone apprehended in an attempt to reach the papal curia or returning from it was imprisoned and subjected to torture.

Lucius died on 25 November 1185, still residing in Verona, while an angry and uncooperative emperor resided at the imperial headquarters in Pavia. The election of his successor, which was brief and unanimous, took place on the next day. The successful candidate was Humbertus Crivelli, the Archbishop of Milan and Cardinal of S. Lorenzo in Damaso, " a violent and unyielding spirit, and a strong opponent of Frederick (Barbarossa)," in the words of Ferdinand Gregorovius. He took the name Urban III, and maintained all of the uncompromising policies of Lucius III. Frederick continued his policy of blockading the pope and cardinals inside Verona into 1187. Urban had reached the decision to excommunicate the emperor, for usurpation of spiritualities, but he was dissuaded by the pleas of the inhabitants of Verona. Shortly after 22 September 1187, Urban and the cardinals escaped from Verona, and by 3 October had found refuge in Ferrara, where Urban died on 20 October.

List of participants
At the death of Pope Urban III there were probably 23 cardinals. Basing on the countersigning of the papal bulls in October 1187 it is possible to establish that probably 13 of them participated in the election of successor of Urban III. According to the rules established by Pope Alexander III, 9 votes would be necessary to elect.

Six electors were created by Pope Lucius III, five by Pope Alexander III, one by Pope Lucius II and one by Pope Adrian IV.

Absentee cardinals
Probably ten cardinals were absent:

Six absentees were created by Lucius III, three by Alexander III, and one by Adrian IV.

Death of Urban III and the election of Pope Gregory VIII
Pope Urban III died at Ferrara on 20 October 1187, grieving over the disasters in the Holy Land. On the following day thirteen cardinals who had been present in Ferrara began the proceedings to elect his successor. They operated according to the rules promulgated by Pope Alexander III at the Third Lateran Council in March 1179.

One of the cardinals under consideration was Henri de Marsiac, the former abbot of Clairvaux. He was aware that he did not have sufficient votes, and forseeing and fearing the danger of dissension, he stood up and announced that, as a servant of the cross of Christ, he was prepared to preach the crusade in various kingdoms and peoples. He was obviously reacting to recent reports of disaster in the Holy Land.<ref>Watterich II, p. 684, quoting Albericus of Trois Fontaines, "Ibidem sanior pars cardinalium voluit dominum Henricum Albanensem quondam Clarevallis abbatem eligere, sed timens et praecavens dissensionis periculum prosiliit in medium, dicens: se crucis Domini servum ad praedicandam crucem per gentes et regna praeparatum."</ref>

Paolo Scolari and Alberto di Morra, the senior cardinal-priest, were also considered. Paolo Scolari was at a disadvantage because he was seriously ill at that time, and was not up to the burden, according to a remark attributed to Cardinal Henri de Marsiac. The cardinals were aware that the papal chancellor, Albert di Morra, was in great favor with the Emperor Frederick Barbarossa, because he was a member of the imperial party in the curia, and because he reported to the emperor all the confidential activities of the Roman curia.  But there remained only the old papal chancellor Alberto di Morra. On 21 October 1187 he was unanimously elected pope and took the name Gregory VIII.

Shortly after the election, the two proctors of the archbishop of Canterbury met with Cardinal Henri de Marsiac. It was Henri who told them of the three candidates, of the indisposition of Cardinal Scolari, and of the election of Cardinal Alberto di Morra, faute de mieux.

He was consecrated a bishop and enthroned on 25 October. He reigned for one month and twenty-eight days.

It is reported by Robert of Auxerre in his Chronicon that the Emperor Frederick was delighted by the choice of Albert, since he was a favorer of justice and would be favorable to him.

Notes

Sources
 Gregorovius, Ferdinand (1896). The History of Rome in the Middle Ages'' Vol. IV, part 2. London: George Bell 1896.

Papal elections
12th-century elections
1187
12th-century Catholicism
1187 in Europe